The 2015–16 Wake Forest Demon Deacons women's basketball team will represent Wake Forest University during the 2015–16 college basketball season. The Demon Deacons, led by fourth year head coach Jen Hoover. The Demon Deacons are members of the Atlantic Coast Conference and play their home games at the Lawrence Joel Veterans Memorial Coliseum.  They finished the season 17–16, 6–10 in ACC play to finish in a tie for ninth place. They advanced to the second round of the ACC women's tournament where they lost to Georgia Tech. They were invited to the Women's National Invitation Tournament where they defeated Charlotte in the first round before losing to Florida Gulf Coast in the second round.

2015–16 media

Wake Forest IMG Sports Network
The Wake Forest Demon Deacons IMG Sports Network will broadcast Demon Deacons games on Wake Forest All Access. You can also keep track on Twitter @WakeWBB. Post game interviews are posted on the schools YouTube Channel.

Roster

Schedule

|-
!colspan=9 style="background:#000000; color:#CBAD71;"| Non-conference regular season

|-
!colspan=9 style="background:#000000; color:#CBAD71;"| ACC regular season

|-
!colspan=9 style="background:#000000; color:#cfb53b;"| ACC Women's Tournament

|-
!colspan=9 style="background:#000000; color:#cfb53b;"| WNIT

Rankings

See also
 2015–16 Wake Forest Demon Deacons men's basketball team

References

Wake Forest Demon Deacons women's basketball seasons
Wake Forest
2016 Women's National Invitation Tournament participants